Johnstown Center is an unincorporated community located in the town of Johnstown, Rock County, Wisconsin, United States.

In 1854, land was purchased in Johnstown Center by the Rock County Board to establish the Rock County Poor Farm and Alms House. The institution became the Rock County Asylum in 1881.

Notes

Unincorporated communities in Rock County, Wisconsin
Unincorporated communities in Wisconsin